The Malfated are an English independent guitar band from London, England, who gained a cult following using online websites such as MySpace. The band formed in 2004, and were one of the first UK bands to join MySpace in 2004. They use a drum machine, which they call 'Bel The Expendable Drum Machine'. Line ups have gone through various changes, Karl Steiger being the only constant. The current line-up of The Malfated is Karl Steiger (vocals, bass, keyboards, percussion) and Robert Ackerman (all guitars, bass, keyboards). 

The Malfated's lyrics and music are predominantly written by frontman Karl Steiger, with occasional musical input from guitarist Natasha Spencer. Their sound draws from a large range of guitar genres - gothic rock, rock music, rock and roll, heavy metal, punk rock, indie rock, glam rock, deathrock, psychedelic rock, alternative metal, and pop - and their fanbase is largely made up of individuals from various alternative subcultures. The Malfated are part of a significant new breed of British bands using the Internet to reach out to people, rather than being dependent on television and printed mass media. Upon their arrival on MySpace, The Malfated regularly out-performed bigger bands such as Green Day in the MySpace charts, and continue to remain a mainstay.

Although The Malfated have been approached by various independent labels, the band decided to go it alone, recording, pressing and distributing their own material which they then sold online. This meant that they retained complete control of the material they were able to record and release, as well as being able to release the sleeve artwork of their choosing. Their debut CD, Rat Candy, was released in June 2006 to immediate fanfare, and has currently sold in excess of five thousand copies, in an age when a big star on a big label need only sell three thousand singles to reach Number One in the UK Singles Chart.

Discography

Albums
Rat Candy - Released by Malfated Records in 2006.

Members

Current
 Karl Steiger - Vocals, bass, keyboards, guitars, production, composition (2002-)
 Rob Ackerman - Guitars (2009-)

Former
 Natasha Spencer - Guitars (2004–2006)
 Paul Tovell - Guitars (2003–2004)
 David Keys - Keyboards, piano, synthesizers (2006)

Trivia
Debut album 'Rat Candy' was released on 06.06.06. Guitarist Natasha Spencer said, "We were originally due to release it on Halloween 2005, but we weren’t able to do so due to complications with the guy who was recording it with us. We ended up mastering the CD in 2006 and thought the ‘666’ date was too good to pass up."
Ginger Fish, drummer with Marilyn Manson, has said: "I appreciate what The Malfated are doing. They have my full support"
The Malfated named their drum machine as a homage to English Goth band The Sisters of Mercy, who named their own drum machine 'Doktor Avalanche'.
Karl Steiger cites The Beatles as his favourite band, and the biggest singular influence on The Malfated.
The Malfated's official website was the first site on the Internet to offer free backgrounds specifically for MySpace profiles.
Karl Steiger had originally intended on calling the first Malfated album 'In The Zone' but was beaten to the pip by one Britney Spears.
The Malfated's first album was called 'Rat Candy'. 'Rat Candy' is Southern slang for rat poison. Karl Steiger heard the phrase during a stay in Texas and decided it would make a great song or album title. This same visit to Texas inspired the Malfated song 'The Company of Strangers', the second track on 'Rat Candy'.
The ‘Rat Candy’ CD was recorded in Berwick Street, London, England - the same street immortalized on the cover of ‘(What's the Story) Morning Glory?’ by UK band Oasis (band).
Peter Morris, engineer on The Malfated’s ‘Rat Candy’ album, composed music for movies such as ‘Long Time Dead’, ‘Floating’, ‘Octane’, and ‘Shooting Fish’.
Natasha’s cousin wrote and produced Gina G’s Number 1 pop hit, and Eurovision Song Contest entry, "Ooh Aah... Just A Little Bit’.
Neil Hannon of The Divine Comedy (band) said in 2006, "The Malfated are my new favourite band."

External links

Malfated.com - The Official Malfated Website
The Official Malfated MySpace Profile
The Malfated Lyrics

English alternative rock groups
Musical groups established in 2004
Musical groups from London